F (F-sharp) may refer to:

 F (musical note)
 F-sharp minor, a minor musical scale
 F-sharp major, a major musical scale
  F# (programming language), a .NET programming language
 "F Sharp", a comedic song by Tim Minchin on his So Rock CD
 "F (Wake Up)", a song on Handle With Care by Nuclear Assault
 F A ∞, an album by Godspeed You! Black Emperor
 Rot Lop Fan, the F-Sharp Bell of the Obsidian Deeps, a character from the Green Lantern comics

See also